David Allen Sibley (born October 22, 1961, in Plattsburgh, New York) is an American ornithologist. He is the author and illustrator of The Sibley Guide to Birds,  which rivals Roger Tory Peterson's as the most comprehensive guides for North American ornithological field identification.

Life and work
The son of Yale University ornithologist Fred Sibley, David Sibley began birding in childhood. Sibley got his start as a birdwatcher in Cape May Point, New Jersey in 1980, after dropping out of college. A largely self-taught bird illustrator, he was inspired to pursue creating his own illustrated field guide after leading tours in the 1980s and 1990s and finding that existing field guides did not generally illustrate or describe alternate or juvenile plumages of birds. He cites European wildlife artist Lars Jonsson as a great influence on his own work. In 2002, he received the Roger Tory Peterson Award from the American Birding Association for lifetime achievement in promoting the cause of birding.  In 2006, he was awarded the Linnaean Society of New York's Eisenmann Medal.

Sibley is married, with two sons, and currently lives in Concord, Massachusetts. He is not known to be related to ornithologist Charles Sibley, although his father studied under and worked for Charles at Yale. Charles did some genealogical research but found they could be no closer than fourth cousins.

Publications

The following is a list of publications which Sibley has written or illustrated:

 The Birds of Cape May
 Sibley's Birding Basics
 The Sibley Guide to Birds
 The Sibley Guide to Bird Life and Behavior
 The Sibley Field Guide to Birds of Eastern North America
 The Sibley Field Guide to Birds of Western North America
 Hawks in Flight
 The Sibley Guide to Trees
 What It's Like to Be a Bird: From Flying to Nesting, Eating to Singing--What Birds Are Doing, and Why
 Bright Wings: An Illustrated Anthology of Poems About Birds, edited by Billy Collins

References

External links

 Sibley Guides: Presenting the Work of David Allen Sibley
 Blog- Sibley Guides
 David Sibley Interview at Virtual Birder
 Nature: About David Allen Sibley Random House Interview
 Springtime Birding with David Sibley Living on Earth Interview

1961 births
Living people
American ornithologists
American bird artists
People from Cape May Point, New Jersey
People from Plattsburgh, New York